The Thousand Islands Parkway (often written as 1000 Islands Parkway) is a scenic parkway in the Canadian province of Ontario. The parkway follows the north shore of the St. Lawrence River, and was formerly designated Highway2S (S for Scenic) until 1970. It passes through the communities of Gray's Beach, Halsteads Bay, Ivy Lea, Darlingside, Rockport, Narrows, La Rue Mills and Mallorytown Landing, as well as providing access to the three inland properties of the Thousand Islands National Park. Highway 137, which meets the parkway near its midpoint, provides access to the Interstate 81 in New York via the Thousand Islands Bridge.

The Thousand Islands Parkway was constructed as a divided highway during the late 1930s, alongside the Thousand Islands Bridge, which opened in 1938. Originally known as the St. Lawrence River Road, the parkway was signed as part of Highway401 when the 400-series highway system was established in 1952, but was bypassed by the current Highway401 alignment to the north in 1968. The Highway2S designation returned between 1967 and 1970, after which jurisdiction over the parkway was transferred to the St. Lawrence Parks Commission. The northern carriageway of the parkway was never paved, and was only in use by vehicles between 1938 and 1951. Evidence of its former use can be seen today in the wide right-of-way; the unused westbound lanes now serve as a recreational trail and twin bridges span two locations along the parkway.

Route description 

The Thousand Islands Parkway is a scenic route along the St. Lawrence River between Gananoque and Brockville through the rugged terrain of the Frontenac Arch, a protrusion of the Canadian Shield southward into New York state. In this area, the soil is underlain by layers of Paleozoic limestone and a granite bedrock. The granite often extends above the ground surface as large rock outcroppings. The Thousand Islands Parkway was part of the original alignment of Highway401. However, because of the residential properties and the scenic nature of the route, a new inland route was constructed through the mid-1960s. A recreational trail follows the right-of-way of the westbound carriageway, which was never completed.

The Thousand Islands Parkway begins at a split with Highway401 on the outskirts of Gananoque. There is no access from westbound Highway401 to the parkway nor from westbound on the parkway to eastbound Highway401. However, immediately east of the split, both highways interchange with the sole remaining portion of Highway 2 under provincial jurisdiction.
East of this point the three diverge into the Frontenac Arch. It meets Highway137 at an interchange at the parkways midpoint; the Ontario approach to the Thousand Islands Bridge which continues as Interstate 81 south of the Canada–United States border. The parkway continues northeast, serving the riverside communities of Darlingside, Rockport, Narrows, La Rue Mills and Mallorytown Landing. At Butternut Bay, the Thousand Islands Parkway merges into the eastbound lanes of Highway401 and a left-hand exit provides access to the parkway from westbound Highway401.
The three inland properties of Thousand Islands National Park are located on the Thousand Islands Parkway: Landon Bay, Mallorytown Landing and Jones Creek.

History 

The idea for a scenic parkway along the shoreline of the St. Lawrence between Gananoque and Brockville was first proposed by George Fulford, a local Member of Provincial Parliament (MPP) elected in the 1934 Ontario general election to represent Leeds.
By 1935, with early construction underway on the Thousand Islands Bridge,
Fulford had convinced the incoming Minister of Public Works and Highways, Thomas McQuesten, of the merits of a scenic route for tourism and as a depression relief project.
McQuesten, who was seeking to build a trans-provincial divided highway, decided the river road would be the ideal route through the rough terrain between Gananoque and Brockville.
On April29, 1937, The Ontario Department of Highways (DHO), predecessor to the modern Ministry of Transportation, formally announced the building of the St. Lawrence River Road.
It was built under two separate contracts. Work on the first, awarded to Campbell Construction to build the section between Gananoque and Ivy Lea, began the week of June7, 1937,
while work on the second, awarded to Standard Paving Company to build the section between Ivy Lea and Butternut Bay, began the week of September12. Standard Paving was already widening  of Highway2 between Butternut Bay and Brockville at the time.

On August18, 1938, the Thousand Islands Bridge was opened, with an attendance of over 50,000 people. Prime Minister Mackenzie King and President Franklin D. Roosevelt both presided over the ceremonies.
In preparation, the  portion of the parkway west of Ivy Lea was quickly gravelled to provide access to the new bridge.
A section between Mallorytown Landing and Butternut Bay was opened in October 1938 as a two-lane gravel road with a temporary bridge crossing Jones Creek.
Elsewhere, construction resumed on blasting rock and grading the route for several more years.
A contract to build the bridges at Jones Creek was awarded on May25, 1940,
and completed by the end of the year.
The bridges at Landon Bay meanwhile, were completed in late October 1940.
In 1941, the St. Lawrence River Road was completed and opened to traffic from Gananoque to Brockville, though it remained unpaved.
Labour and material shortages during World War II resulted in road construction being deferred for several years.
Following the war, the south lanes of the road were paved between Gananoque and Rockport in 1946.
The unpaved north lanes were opened to travel beginning in 1946.
They remained in service until 1951, when they were closed to traffic;
they would not reopen.

By 1948, the St. Lawrence River Road, or "Scenic Highway", had been assigned the route number 2S, with the "S" for "scenic", and the remainder of the south lanes between Rockport and Butternut Bay had been paved.
In July 1952 (possibly July 1, the same day Highway400 was numbered),
Highway2S was designated as part of the new Highway401.
For the next 18years, Highway401 travelled along the scenic river road. Initially it merely bypassed Highway2; it would not see extensions west of Gananoque and east of Butternut Bay until 1959.
That year saw the south lanes of the parkway rebuilt and marked as a proper two-lane undivided highway.
As originally envisioned by McQuesten, the trans-provincial freeway would follow the scenic highway.
However, in the decades since, numerous properties and a tourist industry were established. James Auld, MPP for Leeds and the Minister of Tourism and Information, joined local residents to persuade the DHO to construct an inland bypass. The DHO agreed, stating that it would cost less to build a new freeway than to upgrade the parkway.

Construction of the Thousand Islands Bypass began in 1965, with work proceeding east from Gananoque. The Thousand Islands Parkway was the final two-lane segment of Highway401. 
A portion was opened on September1, 1967, from Gananoque to Highway137, which was itself built south to the parkway at the same time. The Highway401 designation was applied along this new route, while the bypassed portion of the parkway was redesignated as Highway2S.
Despite the expected influx of traffic from the United States for Expo 67 in Montreal, the DHO opted to build the portion east of Ivy Lea after the centennial celebrations.
The remainder of the bypass was opened to traffic on October11, 1968, at which point the entire parkway once again became Highway2S.
This designation would also only last for just under two years. On September8, 1970, the DHO transferred jurisdiction over the parkway to the St. Lawrence Parks Commission;
it has since been known only as the Thousand Islands Parkway.
This name was first brought forward to the DHO in 1954 by the Thousand Island–Rideau Lakes Association.

Major intersections 

|-
! scope="row" style="text-align: right;" | 1.0
! scope="row" style="text-align: right;" | 0.6
| 
| Provides access to eastbound and from westbound Highway401

Explanatory notes

References

Bibliography

External links 

 Thousand Islands Parkway – Length and Route

Geography of Leeds and Grenville United Counties
1938 establishments in Ontario
Parkways in Ontario
Thousand Islands
St. Lawrence Parks Commission